SCM Craiova is a Romanian sports society from Craiova, Romania, founded in 2006. SCM as a subordinated of CS Universitatea Craiova, mother club, administrates basketball, handball, volleyball and boxing sections while CS Universitatea administrates athletics, badminton, bridge, chess, fencing, judo, karate, table tennis and wrestling sections. Football section was originally a section of CS Universitatea Craiova but now is limited private, but still tied of this multi-sports association between SCM and CS Universitatea.

External links 
SCM Craiova website 
CS Universitatea website 

Sports clubs established in 2006
Multi-sport clubs in Romania
University and college sports clubs
Sport in Craiova
SCM Craiova